Yuvraj Sambhajiraje Chhatrapati (born 11 February 1971) is an Indian politician, who served as the member in the upper house of the Parliament of India. He is heir to Kolhapur royal family as the 13th direct descendant of the Maratha king, Chhatrapati Shivaji Maharaj and great grandson of Rajarshi Chhatrapati Shahu of Kolhapur;both were educated at the Rajkumar College, Rajkot a century apart. 

Low profile and soft-spoken, he was the face of Maratha protest for reservation in 2011–19.  He is currently an independent politician.

On 11 June 2016, he was nominated to the Rajya Sabha by then President of India, Pranab Mukherjee.

On 12 May 2022, he founded Swarajya Sanghatan, a social Organisation.

References

20th-century Indian monarchs
Maharajas of Maharashtra
Living people
1971 births
Maharashtra politicians
Nominated members of the Rajya Sabha
Rajya Sabha members from Maharashtra
People from Kolhapur
Bharatiya Janata Party politicians from Maharashtra